Breoghania is a Gram-negative genus of bacteria from the order of Hyphomicrobiales with one known species (Breoghania corrubedonensis).
Breoghania corrubedonensis has been isolated from beach sand which was contaminated with oil from Corrubedo in Spain.

References

Hyphomicrobiales
Bacteria genera
Monotypic bacteria genera
Taxa described in 2011